List of publications by Joseph Paul Forgas

Publications - books 

1.  Forgas, J.P. (1979). Social episodes: The study of interaction routines. London and New York: Academic Press.
2.  Forgas, J.P. (Ed.) (1981). Social cognition: Perspectives on everyday understanding.  London and New York: Academic Press.
3.  Gardner, G., Innes, M., Forgas, J.P., O'Driscoll, M., Pearce, P. & Newton, J. (Eds.) (1981).  Social Psychology.  Melbourne: Prentice-Hall.
4.  Forgas, J.P. (1985)  Interpersonal behaviour: The psychology of social interaction.  Sydney & Oxford: Pergamon Press. Reprinted 1988, 1990, 1993, 1996, 1998, 2000. 
Also published in Japanese, Chinese, Persian and as: Forgas,J.P. (1988). Soziale Interaktion und Kommunikation. Munich & Weinheim: Psychologie Verlags Union. (Further editions in 1992, 1995, 1997, 1999, 2001).
Forgas, J.P. (1989). Comportamento Interpersonale. Roma: Armando Editore. (Further editions in 1995, 1998, 2000)
Forgas, J.P. (1989). A tarsadalmi erintkezes psychologiaja. Budapest: Gondolat. (Further editions in 1994, 1996, 1998, 1999, 2000, 2001,2003, 2004)
5.  Forgas, J.P. (Ed.) (1985) Language and social situations.  Vol. 9 in Springer Series in Social Psychology, New York: Springer.
6.  Fiedler, K. & Forgas, J.P. (Eds.) (1988) Affect, cognition and social behavior.  Toronto: Hogrefe International
7.  Forgas, J.P. & Innes, M.J. (Eds.) (1989) Recent advances in social psychology: An international perspective. Amsterdam: North Holland Publishing Co.
8.	Forgas, J.P.  (1991) Emotion and social judgments.  Oxford: Pergamon
9.	Eich, E.E., Kihlstrom, J.F., Bower, G.H., Forgas, J.P. & Niedenthal, P. (2000). Cognition and emotion. New York: Oxford University Press.
10.	 Forgas, J.P. (Ed.) (2000). Feeling and thinking: Affective influences on social cognition. New York: Cambridge University Press.
10/a	Bless, H. & Forgas, J.P. (Eds.). (2000). The message within: Subjective experiences and social cognition. Philadelphia: Psychology Press.
11.	Forgas, J.P. (Ed.) (2001). Handbook of affect and social cognition. Mahwah, New Jersey: Erlbaum.
12.	Forgas, J.P., Williams, K. R. & Wheeler, L. (Eds.) (2001).  The social mind: Cognitive and motivational aspects of interpersonal behavior. New York: Cambridge University Press. (Also published in Polish, 2005).
13.	Ciarrochi, J.V., Forgas, J.P. & Mayer, J. D. (Eds.)  (2001).  Emotional intelligence in everyday life. Philadelphia: Psychology Press. 
14.	Forgas, J.P. & Williams, K. D. (Eds.). (2001). Social influence: Direct and indirect processes. Philadelphia: Psychology Press.
15.	Forgas, J.P. & Williams, K.D. (Eds.) (2002). The social self: Individual, interpersonal and intergroup perspectives. New York: Psychology Press. 
16.	Forgas, J.P., Williams, K.D. & von Hippel, W. (Eds.) (2003). Social judgments: Explicit and implicit processes. New York: Cambridge University Press.
17.	Forgas, J.P., Williams, K.D & Laham, S. (Eds.) (2004). Social Motivation: Conscious and unconscious processes. New York: Cambridge University Press.
18.	Williams, K.D., Forgas, J.P. & von Hippel, W. (Eds.). (2005). The social outcast: Social rejection, exclusion and ostracism. New York: Psychology Press.
19.	Ciarrochi, J.V., Forgas, J.P.  & Mayer, J.D. (Eds.). (2006). Emotional intelligence in everyday life. (2nd edition). New York: Psychology Press.
20.	Forgas, J.P. (Ed.) (2006). Affect, cognition and social behaviour. New York: Psychology Press.
21.	Forgas, J.P., Haselton, M. & von Hippel, W. (Eds.). (2007). Evolution and the social mind: Evolutionary psychology and social cognition. New York: Psychology Press.
22.	Forgas, J.P. & Fitness, J. (Eds.). (2008). Personal relationships. New York: Psychology Press. 
23.	Forgas, J.P.,  Baumeister, R. H. & Tice, D. M. (Eds.). (2009). Self-regulation: Cognitive, affective and motivational processes. New York: Psychology Press.  
24.	Forgas, J.P., Cooper, J. & Crano, W. (Eds.) (2010). Attitudes and attitude change. New York: Psychology Press.
25.	Forgas, J.P, Kruglanski, A. & Williams, K.D. (Eds.).  (2011). Social conflict and aggression. New York: Psychology Press.
26.	Forgas, J.P., Fiedler, K. & Sedikides, C. (Eds.). (2013). Social thinking and interpersonal behaviour. New York: Psychology Press.
27.	 Forgas, J. P. Vincze, O. & Laszlo, J. (Eds.). (in press). Social cognition and communication. New York: Psychology Press.

Publications - book contributions 

1.	Forgas, J.P. (1979) Multidimensional scaling: a discovery method in social psychology. In: G.P. Ginsburg (Ed.) Emerging strategies in social psychology.  London: Wiley.
2.	Forgas, J.P. (1980)  The structure of social episodes.  In: Proceedings, XXIInd International Congress of Psychology, Leipzig: University Press.
3.	Forgas, J.P. (1981) Social perception.  In: G. Gardner et al. (Eds.) Social psychology. Melbourne: Prentice-Hall.
4.	Forgas, J.P. (1981)  Interpersonal communication.  In: G. Gardner et al. (Eds.)  Social psychology. Melbourne: Prentice-Hall
5.	Forgas, J.P. (1981)  The development of relationships.  In: G. Gardner et al. (Eds.) Social psychology. Melbourne: Prentice-Hall.
6.	Forgas, J.P. (1981) Affective and emotional influences on episode representations.  In: J.P. Forgas (Ed.) Social cognition.  London & New York: Academic Press.
7.	Forgas, J.P. (1981) What is social about social cognition?.  In: J.P. Forgas (Ed.) Social cognition.  London & New York: Academic Press.
8.	Forgas, J.P. (1981) Epilogue: Everyday understanding and social cognition.  In: J.P. Forgas (Ed.) Social cognition.  London & New York: Academic Press.
9.	Tajfel, S. & Forgas, J.P. (1982) Social categorisation: cognitions, values and groups.  In: J.P. Forgas (Ed.) Social cognition. (pp. 113–140).  London & New York: Academic Press.
10.	Forgas, J.P., Argyle, M. & Ginsburg, G.P. (1982) Person perception and the interaction episode.  In: M. Argyle, A. Furnham & J. Graham (Eds.) Social situations. Cambridge: Cambridge University Press.
11.	Argyle, M., Ginsburg, G.P., Forgas, J.P. & Campbell, A. (1982) Personality constructs in relation to situations.  In: M. Argyle, A. Furnham & J. Graham (Eds.) Social situations.  Cambridge: Cambridge University Press.
12.	Ginsburg, G.P., Argyle, M., Forgas, J.P. & Holtgraves, T. (1982) Reactions to rule-breaking episodes.  In: M. Argyle, A. Furnham & J. Graham (Eds.) Social situations.  Cambridge: Cambridge University Press.
13.	Forgas, J.P. (1982) Multidimensional scaling in social psychology.  In: A.P.M. Coxon and P.M. Davis (Eds.) Key texts in multidimensional scaling.  London: Heinemann.
14.	Forgas, J.P. (1982) Cognitive representations of interaction episodes.  In: H. Hiebsch, H.H. Kelley, A.W. Petrowski and H. Brandstatter (Eds.) Social interaction.  Amsterdam: North Holland Publishers.
15.	Forgas, J.P. (1982) Episode cognition: internal representations of interaction routines.  In: L. Berkowitz (Ed.) Advances in Experimental Social Psychology (pp. 59–104), New York: Academic Press.
16.	Forgas, J.P. (1985)  On the situational nature of language in social interaction.  In: J.P. Forgas (Ed.) Language and social situations.  New York: Springer.
17.	Forgas, J.P. (1985) Cognitive representations of interaction episodes and social skill.  In: G. D'Ydewalle (Ed.) Cognition, information processing and motivation.  Amsterdam: North Holland Publishers.
18.	Bergmann, G. & Forgas, J.P. (1985) Situational variation in speech dysfluencies in interpersonal communication.  In: J.P. Forgas (Ed.) Language and social situations.  New York: Springer.
19.	Forgas, J.P. (1986) Cognitive representations of aggressive situations.  In: A. Campbell & J. Gibbs (Eds.) Violent transactions. Oxford: Blackwells.
20.	Forgas, J.P. (1986) Multidimensional Scaling (MDS).  In: R. Harre & R. Lamb (Eds.) Encyclopaedic Dictionary of Psychology. Oxford: Blackwells.
21.	Forgas, J.P. (1988) Episode representations in intercultural communication.  In: Y.Y. Kim and W.B. Gudykunst (Eds.)  Theorizing intercultural communication.  Beverly Hills: Sage.
22.	Forgas, J.P. & Bower, G.H. (1988)  Affect in social and personal judgments.  In: K. Fiedler and J.P. Forgas (Eds.) Affect, cognition and social behaviour, Toronto: Hogrefe International.
23.	Forgas, J.P. (1988) Self-presentation.  In: G. Wilson (Ed.) The book of personality and emotional well-being.  Dorchester: Andromeda Oxford. (Also reprinted by Salem House, Topsfield, Mass., and Reader's Digest).
24.	Forgas, J.P. (1991) Affect and cognition in close relationships.  In G. Fletcher & F. Fincham (Eds) Cognition in close relationships.  New Jersey: Erlbaum.
25.	Forgas, J.P.,  Burnham, D. & Trimboli, C. (1991) Mood effects on memory and social judgments in children. In: K. McConkey & N. Bond (Eds.) Readings in Australian psychology. Sydney: Harcourt Brace Jovanovich.
26.	Forgas, J.P. (1992). Affect and social perception: Research evidence and an integrative theory. In: W. Stroebe & M. Hewstone (Eds.) European Review of Social Psychology. Chichester: Wiley.
27.	Forgas, J.P. (1992). Affect in social judgments and decisions: A multi-process model. In: M. Zanna (Ed.) Advances in Experimental Social Psychology. New York: Academic Press.
28.	Forgas, J.P. & Van Heck, G.L. (1992). The psychology of situations. In: G.V. Caprara & G.L. Van Heck (Eds.) Modern personality psychology. New York: Harvester-Wheatsheaf.
29.	Forgas, J.P. (1992). Affect, appraisal and action: Towards a multi-process framework. In R.S. Wyer & T.K. Srull (Eds.) Advances in social cognition. Hillsdale: Erlbaum.
30.	Forgas, J.P. (1995). Social episodes. In M. Hewstone & A. Manstead (Eds.) An encyclopaedic dictionary of psychology. Oxford: Blackwell.
31.	Forgas, J.P. (1995).  The role of emotion scripts and transient moods in relationships: Structural and functional perspectives. In: G.J.O. Fletcher & J. Fitness (Eds.) Knowledge structures and interaction in close relationships: A social psychological approach.  Hillsdale, N.J.: Erlbaum. 
32.	Forgas, J.P., Johnson, R. & Ciarrochi, J. (1998). Mood management: The role of processing strategies in affect control and affect infusion. In: M. Kofta, G. Weary & G. Sedek (Eds.) Personal control in action: Cognitive and motivational mechanisms. (pp. 155–189). New York: Plenum Press.
33.	Forgas, J.P. (1999). Network theories and beyond. In: T. Dalgleish & M. Power (Eds.) The handbook of cognition and emotion. (pp. 591–612). Chichester: Wiley.
34.	Forgas, J.P. & Vargas, P.T. (1999). Affect, goals and the self-regulation of behavior. In: R.S. Wyer & T. Srull (Eds.) Advances in social cognition. (pp. 119–146). Mahwah, N.J.: Erlbaum.
35.	Bless, H. & Forgas, J.P. (2000). The message within: Towards a social psychology of subjective experiences. In: H. Bless & J.P. Forgas (Eds.). The message within: Subjective experiences and social cognition. (pp. 179–202). Philadelphia: Psychology Press. 
36.	Forgas, J.P. Ciarrochi, J.V. & Moylan, S.J. (2000). Subjective experience and mood regulation: The role of information processing strategies. In: H. Bless & J.P. Forgas (Eds.). The message within: Subjective experiences and social cognition. (pp. 179–202). Philadelphia: Psychology Press. 
37.	Forgas, J.P. (2000). Affect and information processing strategies: an interactive relationship. In: J.P. Forgas (Ed.). Feeling and thinking: The role of affect in social cognition. (pp. 253–282). New York: Cambridge University Press.
38.	Forgas, J.P. (2000). Introduction: The role of affect in social cognition.. In: J.P. Forgas (Ed.). Feeling and thinking: The role of affect in social cognition. (pp. 1–30). New York: Cambridge University Press.
39.	Forgas, J.P. (2000). Feeling and thinking: summary and integration.. In: J.P. Forgas (Ed.). Feeling and thinking: The role of affect in social cognition. (pp. 387–406). New York: Cambridge University Press.
40.	Forgas, J.P. (2000). Feeling is believing? The role of processing strategies in mediating affective influences on beliefs. In: N.H. Frijda, A.S.R. Manstead & S. Bem (Eds.) Emotions and beliefs: How feelings influence thoughts. (pp. 108–144). Cambridge: Cambridge University Press. 
41.	Forgas, J.P. (2000). Affective influences on communication and attribution in relationships. In: V. Manusov & J.H. Harvey (Eds.). Attribution communication behavior and close relationships. (pp. 3–21). New York: Cambridge University Press.
42.	Forgas, J.P. &  Ciarrochi, J.V. (2000). Affect infusion and affect control: The interactive role of conscious and unconscious processing strategies in mood management. In: Y. Rossetti & A. Revonsuo (Eds.). Beyond dissociation: Interaction between dissociated implicit and explicit  processing. (pp. 243–271). London: John Benjamins.
43.	Forgas, J.P. & Vargas, P.T. (2000). Effects of moods on social judgment and reasoning. In: M. Lewis & M. Haviland-Jones (Eds.). Handbook of emotions. (pp. 350–368). Guilford: New York.
44.	Tajfel, H. & Forgas, J. P. (2000). Social categorization: cognitions, values, and groups. In: C. Stangor (Ed.). Stereotypes and prejudice: Essential readings. (pp. 49–63). Psychology Press: Philadelphia.
45.	Forgas, J.P. (2001). Introduction: Affect and social cognition. In: J.P. Forgas (Ed.). Handbook of affect and social cognition. (pp. 1–24). Mahwah, New Jersey: Lawrence Erlbaum.
46.	Forgas, J.P. (2001). Affect, cognition and interpersonal behavior: The mediating role of processing strategies. In: J.P. Forgas (Ed.). Handbook of affect and social cognition. (pp. 293–318). Mahwah, New Jersey: Lawrence Erlbaum.
47.	Forgas, J.P. (2001). Affect and the social mind: Affective influences on strategic interpersonal behaviors. In: J.P. Forgas, K. D. Williams and L. Wheeler (Eds.). The social mind: Cognitive and motivational aspects of interpersonal behavior. (pp. 46–72). New York: Cambridge University Press.
48.	Forgas, J.P., Williams, K. R. & Wheeler, L. (2001). The social mind: introduction and overview. In: J.P. Forgas, K. D. Williams and L. Wheeler (Eds.). The social mind: Cognitive and motivational aspects of interpersonal behavior. (pp. 1–25). New York: Cambridge University Press.
49.	Bower, G.H. & Forgas, J.P. (2001). Mood and social memory. In: J.P. Forgas (Ed.). Handbook of affect and social cognition. (pp. 95–120). Mahwah, New Jersey: Lawrence Erlbaum.
50.	Forgas, J.P. (2001). The Affect Infusion Model (AIM): An integrative theory of mood effects on cognition and judgments. In: L.L. Martin & G.L. Clore (Eds.). Theories of mood and cognition. (pp. 99–134). Mahwah, N.J.: Erlbaum.
51.	Forgas, J.P. & Bower, G.H. (2001). Mood effects on person perception judgments. In: W. G. Parrott (Ed.) Emotions in social psychology. (pp. 204–216). Philadelphia: Psychology Press.
52.	Forgas, J.P. (2002). Feeling and thinking: The influence of affect on social cognition and behaviour. In: L. Baeckman & C. von Hofsten (Eds.). Psychology at the turn of the millennium: Cognitive, Biological and Health Perspectives. (pp. 455–481). New York: Psychology Press.
53.	Forgas, J.P. & Moylan, S.J. (2002). Affective influences on self-perception and self-disclosure. In: J.P. Forgas & K. D. Williams, (Eds.) The social self: Individual, interpersonal and intergroup perspectives. (pp. 73–96). New York: Psychology Press. 
54.	Forgas, J.P. (2003). Affective influences on attitudes and judgments. In: R.J. Davidson, K.R. Scherer and H. Goldsmith, (Eds.) Handbook of Affective Sciences. (pp. 596–618). Oxford University Press.
55.	 Forgas, J.P., Williams, K.D. & von Hippel, W. (2003). Responding to the social world: Explicit and implicit processes in social judgments. In: J.P. Forgas, K.D. Williams, & W. von Hippel (Eds.). Social judgments: Explicit and implicit processes (pp. 1–22). New York: Cambridge University Press.
56.	Forgas, J.P. & East, R. (2003). Affective influences on social judgments and decisions: Implicit and explicit processes. In: J.P. Forgas, K.D. Williams, & W. von Hippel (Eds.). Social judgments: Explicit and implicit processes (pp. 198–226). New York: Cambridge University Press.
57.	Forgas, J.P. & Smith, C.A. (2003). Affect and emotion. In: M. Hogg & J. Cooper (Eds.). The SAGE handbook of social psychology. (pp. 161–189). London: Sage.
58.	Eich, E. & Forgas, J.P. (2003). Mood, cognition, and memory.  In A.F. Healy & R.W. Proctor (Volume Eds.), Experimental Psychology (pp. 33–61). Volume 4 in I.B. Weiner (Editor-in-Chief) Handbook of psychology. New York: Wiley. 
59.	Forgas, J.P., Williams, K.D. & Laham,S. M. (2004). Social motivation: Introduction and overview.  In: J.P. Forgas, K.D. Williams, & S. Laham Social motivation: Conscious and unconscious processes. (pp. 1–20). New York: Cambridge University Press.
60.	Forgas, J.P. & Laham, S. (2004). The role of affect in social motivation. In: J.P. Forgas, K.D. Williams, & S. Laham Social motivation: Conscious and unconscious processes (pp. 168–193). New York: Cambridge University Press.
61.	Forgas, J.P. (2005). The psychology of social cognition and affect. In: Baltes, P. & Schmelzer, P. (Eds.). The International Encyclopaedia of the Social Sciences. (pp. 14238–14242). Oxford: Elsevier. 
62.	Williams, K.D., Forgas, J.P., von Hippel W. & Zadro, L. (2005). The social outcast: an overview. In: K.D. Williams, J.P. Forgas & W. von Hippel (eds.). The social outcast: Ostracism, social exclusion, rejection and bullying. (pp. 1–18). New York: Psychology Press.
63.	Forgas, J.P. (2006). Research on affect and social behavior: Links to cognitive, learning and neuropsychology. In: P.A. M. van Lange (Ed.). Bridging social psychology: Benefits of transdisciplinary approaches. (pp. 117–122). Mahwah, New Jersey: Erlbaum. 
64.	Forgas, J.P. & Wyland, C.L. (2006). Affective intelligence: Understanding the role of affect in everyday social behaviour. In: J. Ciarrochi, J.P. Forgas & J.D. Mayer (Eds.). Emotional intelligence in everyday life. (pp. 77–99). New York: Psychology Press.
65.	Forgas, J.P. Wyland, C. L. & Laham, S. M. (2006). Hearts and minds: An introduction to the role of affect in social cognition and behaviour. In: J.P. Forgas (Ed.). Affect in Social Thinking and Behavior. (pp. 1–18). New York: Psychology Press.
66.	Forgas, J.P. (2006). Affective influences on interpersonal behaviour: Toward understanding the role of affect in everyday interactions.  In: J.P. Forgas (Ed.). Affect in Social Thinking and Behavior. (pp. 269–290). New York: Psychology Press.
67.	Forgas, J.P. & Smith, C.A. (2007). Affect and emotion. In: M. Hogg & J. Cooper (Eds.). The SAGE handbook of social psychology: Concise Student Edition. (pp. 146–175). Thousand Oaks: Sage.
68.	Forgas, J.P. (2007). Mood effects on memory, social judgments and social interaction. In: M.A. Gluck, J.R. Anderson & S.M. Kosslyn (Eds.). Memory and Mind: A Festschrift for Gordon H. Bower.  (pp. 262–281). New Jersey: Lawrence Erlbaum Associates.
69.	Forgas, J.P. (2007). The strange cognitive benefits of mild dysphoria: On the evolutionary advantages of not being too happy. In: J.P. Forgas, M.G. Haselton & W. Von Hippel, (Eds.). Evolution and the social mind: Evolutionary psychology and social cognition.  (pp. 107–124. New York: Psychology Press.
70.	Forgas, J.P. & Laham, S. (2007). Recency effects. In: R. Baumeister & K.D. Vohs (Eds.) Encyclopedia of Social Psychology. (pp. 728–729. Thousand Oaks: Sage Publications.
71.	Forgas, J.P. & Laham, S. (2007). Halo effects. In: R. Baumeister & K.D. Vohs (Eds.) Encyclopedia of Social Psychology. (pp. 409–410). Thousand Oaks: Sage Publications. 
72.	Forgas, J.P. (2007). Affect infusion. In: R. Baumeister & K.D. Vohs (Eds.) Encyclopedia of Social Psychology. (pp. 16–18). Thousand Oaks: Sage Publications.
73.	Eich, E., Geraerts, E., Schooler, J. & Forgas, J.P. (2008). Memory in and about affect. In: H.L. Roediger (Ed.), Cognitive psychology. Volume 4 in J. Byrne (Editor-in-Chief), Learning and memory - A comprehensive reference. (pp. 239–260). Oxford: Elsevier.
74.	Forgas, J.P. (2008). The role of affect in attitudes and attitude change. In: W. Crano & J. Prislin (Eds.) Attitudes and attitude change. (pp. 131–160). Psychology Press, New York.
75.	Forgas, J.P. (2008).  Happy and close, but sad and effective? Affective influences on relationship judgments and behaviours. In: J.P. Forgas & J. Fitness (Eds.). Social Relationships. (pp. 203–217). New York: Psychology Press.
76.	Forgas, J.P. & Fitness, J. (2008). Evolutionary, sociocultural and intrapsychic influences on personal relationships: an introductory review. In: J.P. Forgas & J. Fitness (Eds.). Social Relationships. (pp. 3–20). New York: Psychology Press.
77.	Forgas, J. P. (2009). When Sad is Better than Happy: On the Cognitive Benefits of Mild Dysphoria. In: A. Blachnio & A. Przepiorka Closer to emotions. (pp. 21–37). Lublin: Wydawnictwo KUL
78.	Forgas, J.P. (2010). Affect in Legal and Forensic Settings: The Cognitive Benefits of Not Being Too Happy. In: R. Wiener & B. Bornstein (Eds.). Emotion and the law: Psychological perspectives. Nebraska Symposium on Motivation, 56. (pp. 13–44). Springer: New York. 
79.	Forgas, J.P., Baumeister, R.F. & Tice, D.M. (2010). Self-regulation: an introductory review. In: J.P. Forgas, R.F. Baumeister and D.M. Tice (Eds.). Self-regulation: Cognitive, affective and motivational processes. (pp. 1–21). Psychology Press: New York. 
80.	Forgas, J.P. (2010). Cognitive theories of affect. In  I. B. Weiner & W. E. Craighead (Eds.), Corsini’s encyclopedia of psychology (4th ed.). (pp. 350–353). Hoboken, NJ: Wiley.
81.	Forgas, J. P. Cooper, J. & Crano, W. D. (2010). Attitudes and attitude change: An introductory review. In: J. P. Forgas, J. Cooper, & W. D. Crano, (Eds.). Attitudes and attitude change. (pp. 3–19). New York: Psychology Press.
82.	Forgas, J. P. (2010). Affective influences on the formation, expression and change of attitudes. In: J. P. Forgas, J. Cooper, & W. D. Crano, (Eds.). Attitudes and attitude change. (pp. 141–163). New York: Psychology Press.
83.	Forgas, J.P. (2011).  Negative affect and social behaviour: On the adaptive functions of aversive moods. In:  Farzaneh Pahlavan (Ed.). Multiple facets of anger: Getting mad or restoring justice. (pp. 103–119).New York: Nova Science Publishers.
84.	Forgas, J.P.  (2011). Episodes in the mind: Or, beware when the paradigm shifts... In: R. Arkin (Ed.) Most underappreciated: 50 prominent social psychologists describe their most unloved work. (pp. 137–142).  Oxford & New York: Oxford University Press. 
85.	Forgas, J.P. Kruglanski, A.W. & Williams, K.D (2011). The psychology of social conflict and aggression: Homo aggressivus revisited. In: Forgas, J.P, Kruglanski, A. & Williams, K.D. (2011). The psychology of social conflict and aggression. (pp. 3–19). New York: Psychology Press . 
86.	Forgas, J.P. & Tan, H. B. (2011). Affective influences on the perception, management and resolution of social conflicts. In: Forgas, J.P, Kruglanski, A. & Williams, K.D. (2011). The psychology of social conflict and aggression. (pp. 119–139). New York: Psychology Press . 
87.	Forgas, J.P. & Eich, E.E. (2012). Affective Influences on Cognition: Mood Congruence, Mood Dependence, and Mood Effects on Processing Strategies. In A. F. Healy & R. W. Proctor (Eds.), Experimental Psychology. Volume 4 in I. B. Weiner (Editor-in-Chief), Handbook of Psychology. pp. 61–82. New York: Wiley
88.	Forgas, J.P. Fiedler, K. & Sedikides, C. (2013). Social thinking and interpersonal behaviour: Classical theories and current perspectives. In: J.P. Forgas, K. Fiedler, & C. Sedikides (Eds.) Social thinking and interpersonal behaviour. (pp. 1–22). New York: Psychology Press.
89.	Forgas, J.P. (2013). The upside of feeling down: The benefits of negative mood for social cognition and behaviour. In: J.P. Forgas, K. Fiedler, & C. Sedikides (Eds.) Social thinking and interpersonal behaviour. (pp. 221–238). New York: Psychology Press.
90.	Forgas, J.P. & Koch, A. (2013). Mood effects on cognition.  In Michael D. Robinson, Edward R. Watkins and Eddie Harmon-Jones (Eds.) Handbook of Emotion and Cognition. Guilford: New York. 
91.	Forgas, J. P. (2013). Emotional intelligence. In: B. Kaldis (Ed.) Encyclopaedia of Philosophy and the Social Sciences. Sage: thousand Oaks, California.
92.	 Schneider, T.R., Forgas, J., & Klein, G. (in press). Emotion and Naturalistic Decision Making. In M. Wiggins (Ed.), Diagnostic Reasoning in Organisational Environments. New York: Wiley
93.	Forgas, J. P. (in press). On the Downside of Feeling Good: Evidence for the Motivational, Cognitive and Behavioral Disadvantages of Positive Affect. In: Gruber, J. & Moskowitz, J. (Ed.). The dark and light sides of positive emotion. New York: Oxford University Press.
94.	Forgas, J. P. (in press). Can Sadness Be Good For You? On the Cognitive, Motivational and Interpersonal Benefits of Negative Affect. In: Parrott, G. (Ed.). The Positive Side of Negative Emotions.  New York: Guilford Press.
95.	Forgas, J. P. (in press). Feeling and Speaking: Affective Influences on Communication Strategies and Language Use. In: J.P. Forgas, O. Vincze and J. Laszlo (Eds.). Social cognition and communication. New York: Psychology Press.

Publications – Refereed journal articles 

1.	Forgas, J.P. (1976) The perception of social episodes: categorical and dimensional representations in two different social milieus. Journal of Personality and Social Psychology, 34, 199-209.
2.	Forgas, J.P. (1976) An unobtrusive study of reactions to national stereotypes in four European countries.  Journal of Social Psychology, 99, 37-42.
3.	Forgas, J.P. (1977) Polarisation and moderation of person perception judgements as a function of group interaction style.  European Journal of Social Psychology, 7, 175-187.
4.	Forgas, J.P. & Brown, L.B. (1977) Environmental and behavioural cues in the perception of social encounters: an exploratory study.  American Journal of Psychology, 90, 635-644.
5.	Forgas, J.P., Kagan, C. & Frey, D. (1977)  The cognitive representation of political personalities: a cross-cultural comparison.  International Journal of Psychology, 12, 19-30.
6.	Forgas, J.P. (1978) Social episodes and social structure in an academic setting: the social environment of an intact group.  Journal of Experimental Social Psychology, 14, 434-448.
7.	Forgas, J.P. (1978) The effects of behavioural and cultural expectation cues on the perception of social episodes.  European Journal of Social Psychology, 8, 203-213.
8.	Forgas, J.P. & Brown, L.B. (1978)  The effects of encoder race on observer judgements of nonverbal communications.  Journal of Social Psychology, 104, 243-251.
9.	Forgas, J.P., Argyle, M. & Ginsburg, G.P. (1979) Social episodes and person perception: the fluctuating structure of an academic group.  Journal of Social Psychology, 109, 207-222.
10.	Forgas, J.P. & Menyhart, J. (1979)  The perception of political leaders: a multidimensional analysis.  Australian Journal of Psychology, 31, 213-223.
11.	Forgas, J.P. (1980) Images of crime: a multidimensional analysis of individual differences in crime perception.  International Journal of Psychology, 15, 287-299.
12.	Forgas, J.P. (1980) Implicit representations of political leaders: a multidimensional analysis.  Journal of Applied Social Psychology, 10, 95-310.
13.	Forgas, J.P., Brown, L.B. & Menyhart, J. (1980) Dimensions of aggression: the perception of aggressive episodes.  British Journal of Social and Clinical Psychology, 19, 215-227.
14.	Forgas, J.P., & Dobosz, B. (1980) Dimensions of romantic involvement: towards a taxonomy of heterosexual relationships.  Social Psychology Quarterly, 43, 290-300.
15.	Brown, L.B. & Forgas, J.P. (1980) The structure of religion: Multidimensional scaling of informal elements.  Journal for the Scientific Study of Religion, 19, 423-431.
16.	Forgas, J.P. (1981)  Responsibility attribution by groups and individuals: the effects of the interaction episode.  European Journal of Social Psychology, 11, 87-99.
17.	Forgas, J.P. (1981)  Social episodes and group milieu: A study in social cognition.  British Journal of Social Psychology, 20, 77-87.
18.	Forgas, J.P. (1982) Reactions to life dilemmas: Risk taking, success and responsibility attribution.  Australian Journal of Psychology, 34, 25-35.
19.	Forgas, J.P., Morris, S.L. & Furnham, A. (1982)  Lay explanations of wealth: Attribution for economic success.  Journal of Applied Social Psychology, 12, 381-397.
20.	Forgas, J.P. (1983) Social skills and the perception of interaction episodes.  British Journal of Clinical Psychology, 22, 195-207.
21.	Forgas, J.P. (1983) What is social about social cognition?  British Journal of Social Psychology, 22, 129-144.
22.	Forgas, J.P. (1983)  Episode cognition and personality: A multidimensional analysis.  Journal of Personality, 51, 34-48.
23.	Forgas, J.P. (1983)  The effects of prototypicality and cultural salience on perceptions of people. Journal of Research in Personality, 17, 153-173.
24.	Forgas, J.P. (1983) Cognitive representations of interaction episodes.  Australian Journal of Psychology, 35, 145-162.
25.	Forgas, J.P. (1983)  Language, goals and situations.  Journal of Language and Social Psychology, 2, 267-293.
26.	Forgas, J.P., O'Connor, K. & Morris, S.L. (1983). Smile and punishment: The effects of facial expression on responsibility attribution by groups and individuals.  Personality and Social Psychology Bulletin, 9, 587-596.
27.	Forgas, J.P. (1984). Interaction situations and their cognitive representations.  Psychologia, 4, 209-229.
28.	Forgas, J.P., Bower, G.H. & Krantz, S. (1984)  The influence of mood on perceptions of social interactions.  Journal of Experimental Social Psychology, 20, 497-513.
29.	Forgas, J.P. & O'Driscoll, M. (1984)  Cross-cultural and demographic differences in the perception of nations.  Journal of Cross-Cultural Psychology, 15, 199-222.
30.	Bond, M.H. & Forgas, J.P. (1984)  Linking person perception to behaviour intention across cultures: the role of cultural collectivism.  Journal of Cross-Cultural Psychology, 15, 337-352.
31.	Forgas, J.P. (1985)  Person prototypes and cultural salience: the role of cognitive and cultural factors in impression formation.  British Journal of Social Psychology, 24, 3-17.
32.	Forgas, J.P. & Bond, M. (1985)  Cultural influences on the perception of interaction episodes.  Personality and Social Psychology Bulletin, 11, 75-88.
33.	Forgas, J.P. & Bower, G.H. (1987) Mood effects on person perception judgements.  Journal of Personality and Social Psychology, 53, 53-60.
34.	Forgas, J.P. & Moylan, S. (1987)  After the movies: the effects of transient mood states on social judgments.  Personality and Social Psychology Bulletin, 13, 478-489.
35.	Forgas, J.P. & Bower, G.H. (1988)  Affect in social judgments.  Australian Journal of Psychology, 40, 125-145.
36.	Argyle, M.,  Trimboli, C. & Forgas, J.P. (1988)  Disclosure profiles in different relationships.  Journal of Social Psychology, 128, 117-124.
37.	Forgas, J.P., Burnham, D. & Trimboli, C. (1988)  Mood, memory and social judgments in children.  Journal of Personality and Social Psychology, 54, 697-703.
38.	 Forgas, J.P. (1989)  Affective influences on social perception and judgments. Psychologia, 9, 495-520.
39.	 Forgas, J.P., Furnham, A. & Frey, D. (1989)  Cross-national differences in attribution of wealth and economic success.  Journal of Social Psychology, 129, 643-650
40.	 Forgas, J.P. (1989)  Mood effects on personal and impersonal decisions.  Australian Journal of Psychology, 40, 125-145.
41.	 Forgas, J.P. (1990) Affective influences on individual and group judgments. European Journal of Social Psychology, 20, 441-453.
42.	 Forgas, J.P. Bower, G.H. & Moylan, S.J. (1990). Praise or blame? Affective influences on attributions for achievement. Journal of Personality and Social Psychology, 59, 809-819.
43.	 Forgas, J.P. (1991). Mood effects on partner choice: Role of affect in social decisions. Journal of Personality and Social Psychology, 61, 708-720.
44.	 Forgas, J.P. & Moylan, S.J. (1991) Affective influences on stereotype judgments. Cognition and Emotion, 5, 379-397.
45.	Forgas, J.P. (1992) Social thinking or thinking society? Contemporary Psychology, 37, 1051-1053.
46.	Gudykunst, W.B., Forgas, J.P., Franklyn-Stokes, A., Schmidt, K.L. & Moylan, S.J. (1992). The influence of social identity and intimacy of relationship on interethnic communication. Communication Reports, 5, 90-99.
47.	Forgas, J.P. (1992). Mood and the perception of unusual people: Affective asymmetry in memory and social judgments. European Journal of Social Psychology, 22, 531-547.
48.	Forgas, J.P. (1992). On bad mood and peculiar people: Affect and person typicality in impression formation. Journal of Personality and Social Psychology, 62, 863-875.
49.	Forgas, J.P. (1993). On making sense of odd couples: Mood effects on the perception of mismatched relationships. Personality and Social Psychology Bulletin, 19, 59-71.
50.	Forgas, J.P. (1994). The role of emotion in social judgments: An introductory review and an affect infusion model. European Journal of Social Psychology, 24, 1-25.
51.	Forgas, J.P. (1994). Sad and guilty? Affective influences on explanations of conflict episodes. Journal of Personality and Social Psychology, 66, 56-68.
52.	Forgas, J.P., Levinger, G. & Moylan, S. (1994). Feeling good and feeling close: The effects of mood on relationship perception. Personal Relationships, 2, 165-184.
53.	Forgas, J.P. & Jolliffe, C. (1994). How conservative are Greenies? Environmental attitudes, conservatism and traditional morality among university students. Australian Journal of Psychology, 46,  123-130.
54.	Forgas, J.P. Janos, L., Siklaki, I. & Moylan, S. (1995). Images of politics: A multidimensional analysis of implicit representations of political parties in a newly emerging democracy. European Journal of Social Psychology, 25, 481-497.
55.	Forgas, J.P. (1995). Mood and judgment: The Affect Infusion Model (AIM). Psychological Bulletin, 117, 39-66.
56.	 Forgas, J.P. (1995). Strange couples: Mood effects on memory and impressions about prototypical and atypical relationships. Personality and Social Psychology Bulletin,  21, 747-765.
57.	 Forgas, J.P. & Fiedler, K. (1996). Us and them: Mood effects on intergroup discrimination. Journal of Personality and Social Psychology, 70, 28-40.
58.	Forgas, J.P. (1997). Affect and strategic communication: The effects of mood on the production and interpretation of requests. Polish Psychological Bulletin, 28, 145-173.
59.	Forgas, J.P. (1998). Asking nicely? The effects of mood on responding to more or less polite requests. Personality and Social Psychology Bulletin, 24, 173-185.
60.	 Forgas, J.P. (1998). On feeling good and getting your way: Mood effects on negotiating strategies and outcomes. Journal of Personality and Social Psychology. 74, 565-577
61.	 Forgas, J.P. (1998). On being happy but mistaken: Mood effects on the fundamental attribution error. Journal of Personality and Social Psychology, 75, 318-331.
62.	Forgas, J.P. & Vargas, P.T. (1998). Affect and behavior inhibition: The mediating role of cognitive processing strategies. Psychological Inquiry. 9, 205-210.
63.	Forgas, J.P. (1998). Strategies of mood management:  Mood congruent and incongruent thoughts over time. Australian Journal of Psychology, 50, 20-21.
64.	 Forgas, J.P. (1999). On feeling good and being rude: Affective influences on language use and request formulations. Journal of Personality and Social Psychology, 76, 928-939.  
65.	 Forgas, J.P. (1999). Feeling and speaking: Mood effects on verbal communication strategies. Personality and Social Psychology Bulletin, 25, 850-863. 
66.	 Ciarrochi, J.V. & Forgas, J.P. (1999). On being tense yet tolerant: The paradoxical effects of trait anxiety and aversive mood on intergroup judgments. Group Dynamics: Theory, research and Practice. 3, 227-238. 
67.	Forgas, J.P. (2000). Managing moods: Towards a dual-process theory of spontaneous mood regulation. Psychological Inquiry, 11, 172-177. 
68.	Forgas, J.P. (2000). Affect and strategic communication. Hungarian Psychological Review, LV2-3, 145-178. (Forgas, J.P. Az érzelem és a stratégiai kommunikáció: az érzelem hatása a szóbeli kérések megfogalmazására és értelmezésére. Magyar Pszichológiai Szemle 55(2-3), 145-178).
69.	Ciarrochi, J.V. & Forgas, J.P. (2000).  The pleasure of possessions: affective influences and personality in the evaluation of consumer items. European Journal of Social Psychology, 30, 631-649. 
70.	Forgas, J.P. (2001). Feeling and thinking: The influence of affect on social cognition and behaviour. Foreign psychology, 14, 2001, 60-82.   
71.	 Forgas, J.P. & George, J.M. (2001). Affective influences on judgments and behavior in organizations: An information processing perspective. Organizational Behavior and Human decision Processes, 86, 3-34.    
72.	Forgas, J. & Ciarrochi, J.V. (2001). On being happy and possessive: the role of mood and personality on the evaluation of personal  possessions.  Psychology and Marketing, 18, 239-260.
73.	Forgas, J.P., Chan, N.Y.M. & Laham, S.M. (2001).  Affective influences on thinking and behavior: Implications for clinical, applied and preventive psychology.  Applied and Preventive Psychology: Current Scientific Perspectives, 10(4), 225-242.
74.	Forgas, J.P. (2002). Feeling and doing: Affective influences on interpersonal behavior. Psychological Inquiry, 13, 1-28.
75.	Forgas, J.P. (2002). Towards understanding the role of affect in social thinking and behavior. Psychological Inquiry, 13, 90-102. 
76.	Forgas, J.P. & Ciarrochi, J.V. (2002). On managing moods: Evidence for the role of homeostatic cognitive strategies in affect regulation. Personality and Social Psychology Bulletin, 28, 336-345.
77.	Forgas, J.P. (2003). Affective influences on verbal communication strategies. Australian Journal of Psychology, 55, 43.
78.	Forgas, J.P. (2003). Why don’t we do it in the road…? Stereotyping and prejudice in mundane situations. Psychological Inquiry, 14, 249-255.
79.	Forgas, J. P. (2003). Feeling and acting: affective influences on interpersonal behaviour. Transsylvanian Psychological Review, 4(1), 3-34. (Forgas, J. P. Érezni és cselekedni: érzelmi hatások a személyközi viselkedésben II. rész. Erdélyi Pszichológiai Szemle, 4(1), 3-34.
80.	Forgas, J.P. & Cromer, M. (2004). On being sad and evasive: Affective influences on verbal communication strategies in conflict situations. Journal of Experimental Social Psychology, 40, 511-518. 
81.	Forgas, J.P. (2004). Feeling and thinking: The role of affect in social cognition and behaviour. Australian Journal of Psychology, 56, p. 185. 
82.	Forgas, J.P., Von Hippel, W. & Laham, S.M. (2004). An evolutionary model of managing moods: Evidence for the role of homeostatic cognitive strategies in affect regulation. Journal of Cultural and Evolutionary Psychology, 2, 43-60. 
83.	Forgas, J.P., Vargas, P. & Laham, S. (2005).  Mood effects on eyewitness memory: Affective influences on susceptibility to misinformation. Journal of Experimental Social Psychology, 41, 574-588.
84.	Polya, J., Laszlo, J. & Forgas, J.P. (2005). Its not what you say, its how you say it: The effects of different narrative perspective on perceptions of personality and identity. European Journal of Social Psychology, 35, 785-796.
85.	Forgas, J.P. & Tehani, G. (2005). Affective influences on language use: Mood effects on performance feedback by experts and novices. Journal of Language and Social Psychology, 24, 269-284. 
86.	Forgas, J.P. (2005). Uj arcok az akademian. Magyar Pszichologiai Szemle, (Hungarian Review of Psychology) LX3, 371-384.
87.	Forgas, J.P. & Locke, J. (2005). Affective influences on causal inferences: The effects of mood on attributions for positive and negative interpersonal episodes. Cognition and Emotion, 19, 1071-1081.
88.	Halberstadt, J., O’Shea, R.P. & Forgas, J.P. (2006). Outgroup fanship in Australia and New Zealand. Australian Journal of Psychology, 58, 159-165.
89.	 Forgas, J.P. (2007). When sad is better than happy: Negative affect can improve the quality and effectiveness of persuasive messages and social influence strategies. Journal of Experimental Social Psychology, 43, 513-528.
90.	Forgas, J.P., East, R. & Chan, N.Y.M. (2007). The use of computer-mediated interaction in exploring affective influences on strategic interpersonal behaviors. Computers in Human Behavior, 23, 901-919.
91.	Alter, A.L. & Forgas, J.P. (2007). On being happy but fearing failure: The effects of mood on self-handicapping strategies. Journal of Experimental Social Psychology, 43, 947-954.
92.	Wyland, C. & Forgas, J.P. (2007). On bad mood and white bears: The effects of mood state on ability to suppress unwanted thoughts. Cognition and Emotion, 21, pp. 1513–1524.
93.	Forgas, J.P. (2008). Affect and cognition. Perspectives on Psychological Science, 3, 94-101.
94.	Forgas, J.P., Dunn, E. & Granland, S. (2008). Are you being served? An unobtrusive experiment of affective influences on helping in a department store. European Journal of Social Psychology, 38, 333-342. 
95.	Forgas, J.P. & East, R. (2008). How real is that smile?  Mood effects on accepting or rejecting the veracity of emotional facial expressions. Journal of Nonverbal Behavior, 32, 157-170.
96.	Forgas, J.P. & East, R. (2008). On Being Happy and Gullible: Mood effects on skepticism and the detection of deception. Journal of Experimental Social Psychology, 44, 1362-1367.
97.	Unkelbach, C., Guastella, A. & Forgas, J.P. (2008). Oxytocin selectively facilitates recognition of positive sex and relationship words. Psychological Science, 19, 1092-1094. 
98.	Unkelbach, C., Forgas, J.P. & Denson, T. F.  (2008). The turban effect: The influence of Muslim headgear and induced affect on aggressive responses in the shooter bias paradigm. Journal of Experimental Social Psychology, 44, 1409–1413
99.	Forgas, J.P., Goldenberg, L. & Unkelbach, C. (2009). Can bad weather improve your memory? A field study of mood effects on memory in a real-life setting. Journal of Experimental Social Psychology, 54, 254-259. 
100.	Paterson, H. M., Kemp, R.I. & Forgas, J.P. (2009). Co-Witnesses, Confederates, and Conformity: The Effects of Discussion and Delay on Eyewitness Memory Source. Psychiatry, Psychology, and Law, 16, 112-124.
101.	Tan, H.B. & Forgas, J.P. (2010). When happiness makes us selfish, but sadness makes us fair: Affective influences on interpersonal strategies in the dictator game. Journal of Experimental Social Psychology, 46, 571-576.
102.	Wyland, C.L. & Forgas, J.P. (2010). Here’s looking at you kid: Mood effects on processing eye gaze as a heuristic cue.  Social Cognition, 28, 133-144. 
103.	Unkelbach, C., von Hippel, W., Forgas, J.P., Robinson, M. D., Shakarchi, R.J. & Hawkins, C. (2010). Good things come easy: Subjective exposure frequency and the faster processing of positive information. Social Cognition, 28, 539-556.
104.	Sansom-Daly, U. & Forgas, J.P. (2010).  Do blurred faces magnify priming effects? The interactive effects of perceptual fluency and priming on impression formation.  Social Cognition, 28, 630-641.
105.	Forgas, J.P. (2010). Affect and local versus global processing: Affective influences on social memory, judgments and behaviour. Psychological Inquiry.  21, 216-224.
106.	Forgas, J. P. (2011). Affective influences on self-disclosure strategies. Journal of Personality and Social Psychology. 100(3), 449-461.
107.	Forgas, J.P. (2011). Can negative affect eliminate the power of first impressions? Affective influences on primacy and recency effects in impression formation. Journal of Experimental Social Psychology, 47, 425-429. 
108.	Forgas, J.P. (2011). She just doesn’t look like a philosopher...? Affective influences on the halo effect in impression formation. European Journal of Social Psychology, 41,  812–817.
109.	Goldenberg, L. & Forgas, J. P. (2012). Can happy mood reduce the just world bias? Affective influences on blaming the victim. Journal of Experimental Social Psychology, 48, 239-243.
110.	Koch, A. S. & Forgas, J. P. (2012). Feeling good and feeling truth: The interactive effects of mood and processing fluency on truth judgments. Journal of Experimental Social Psychology. 48,  481–485.
111.	Forgas, J. P. (2012). Belief and affect: On the mental pre-cursors of health-related cognition and behaviour. The Journal of Health Psychology. 18, 3-9.  
112.	Forgas, J. P. & Tan, H. B. (2013). To give or to keep? Affective influences on selfishness and fairness in computer-mediated interactions in the dictator game and the ultimatum game. Computers and Human Behavior, 29, 64-74.
113.	Forgas, J. P. & Tan, H. B. (in press) Mood Effects on Selfishness versus Fairness: Affective Influences on Social Decisions in the Ultimatum Game. Social Cognition.
114.	Forgas, J. P. (in press). Don’t Worry, Be Sad! On the Cognitive, Motivational and Interpersonal Benefits of Negative Mood. Current Directions in Psychological Science. 
115.	Koch, A. S. Forgas, J. P. & Matovic, D. (in press). Can negative mood improve your conversation? Affective influences on conforming to Grice’s communication norms. European Journal of Social Psychology.

Work in progress and articles submitted 

Goldenberg, L. & Forgas, J.P. (in preparation). Can positive mood reduce the just world bias? Mood effects on blaming the victim.
Forgas, J.P. (in preparation). Affective influences on interpersonal trust and selfishness.
Forgas, J.P. & Chan, N. (in preparation). Affect, information processing and the use of heuristics.
Forgas, J.P. (in preparation). Affective biases in partner selection.
Forgas, J.P. & Barth, C. (in preparation). Affective influences on group identification. 
Tan, H.B. & Forgas, J.P. (in preparation). Mood, processing styles and interpersonal strategies.
Forgas, J.P. & Fiedler, K. (in preparation) Linguistic abstraction and ingroup-outgroup identification.

Conference papers and colloquia 
Joseph Paul Forgas regularly visits and give invited talks and colloquium at various universities in the USA, Europe and Australia, including the following in recent years: 

Joseph Paul Forgas also regularly attends and presents papers and organise symposia at various national and international conferences relevant in his field, including the following in recent years:

International Congress of Psychology (Invited Keynote Speaker)
Conferences of the Society for Experimental Social Psychology (Invited Symposium Convener)
Conferences of the Society for Personality and Social Psychology
Conferences of the International Society for Research on Emotion
European Association of Experimental Psychology Conferences 
Conferences of the International Society for Research on Personal Relationships
Australian Psychological Society Conferences 
Society of Australasian Social Psychologists Conferences (Invited Keynote Speaker)
Asian Association of Social Psychology Conference 
British Psychological Society Social Psychology Conferences 
International Conferences on Language and Social Psychology

Collaboration 

J. P. Forgas has established and maintain extensive research collaboration in the USA, Britain and Europe, leading to numerous collaborative research projects and publications, as the following summary shows:

Sources 
CV of Joseph Paul Forgas

Social psychologists